Anne Claire Poirier O.C. (born 6 June 1932) is a Canadian film producer, director and screenwriter.

Biography
Poirier was born in Saint-Hyacinthe, Quebec. She was the only female filmmaker on the National Film Board of Canada in the 1960s and 1970s. Her first film, the black and white surrealist fictional documentary De mère en fille (1968), critiques social codes of motherhood and investigates the psychological experience of pregnancy. The film had a significant influence on the nascent feminist movement in Canada. De mère en fille is the first feature film ever directed by a French-Canadian woman. Poirier's film Mourir à tue-tête competed in the Un Certain Regard section at the 1979 Cannes Film Festival. Mourir à tue-tête, which aboards the subject of rape, remains Poirier's best known film. Her 1974 film Les Filles du Roi explores a history of masculinity in Quebec. In 1996, she directed the feature-length documentary Tu as crié: Let me go to understand the events that led to the murder of her daughter.

Awards and honours
In 1988, she was awarded the Prix Albert-Tessier. Tu as crié: Let me go received numerous awards including the Genie Award for Best Feature Length Documentary. In 2001, Poirier received a Governor General's Performing Arts Award for Lifetime Artistic Achievement in film. She was appointed an Officer of the Order of Canada in 2003.

Filmography

Fiction
La fin des étés - 1964, short
Le savoir-faire s'impose - 1971, short
Before the Time Comes (Le temps de l'avant) - 1975
A Scream from Silence (Mourir à tue-tête) - 1979
Beyond Forty (La Quarantaine) - 1982
Salut Victor - 1988

Documentaries
Stampede (Short, 1962)
Nomade de l'Ouest (Short, 1962)
30 Minutes, Mr. Plummer (Short, 1963)
Les ludions (Short, 1965)
De mère en fille (1968)
Les filles du Roy (1974)
Il y a longtemps que je t'aime (1989)
Tu as crié: Let me go (1996)

See also
 List of female film and television directors
 List of LGBT-related films directed by women

References

External links

1932 births
Living people
Film producers from Quebec
Canadian women film directors
Canadian screenwriters in French
Film directors from Quebec
Canadian documentary film directors
Directors of Genie and Canadian Screen Award winners for Best Documentary Film
Governor General's Performing Arts Award winners
Canadian women film producers
Canadian women screenwriters
Officers of the Order of Canada
Prix Albert-Tessier winners
Canadian women documentary filmmakers